Dear Love: A Beautiful Discord is the debut studio album by American metalcore band The Devil Wears Prada. It was released on August 22, 2006, through Rise Records. It includes re-recorded versions of all the tracks from their demo, Patterns of a Horizon, and two original tracks, "Texas is South" and "Dogs Can Grow Beards All Over". The closing track, "Salvation", features guest vocals by Cole Wallace of Gwen Stacy. "Dogs Can Grow Beards All Over" is available for download via the Rock Band Network.

Track listing

Personnel
The Devil Wears Prada
Daniel Williams - drums
Mike Hranica - lead vocals
Jeremy DePoyster - rhythm guitar, clean vocals, additional screams on "Modeify the Pronunctuation"
Andy Trick - bass guitar
Chris Rubey - lead guitar
James Baney - keyboards, synthesizer, piano, additional clean vocals on "Swords, Dragons & Diet Coke"

Production
Kris Crummett – mastering
Joey Sturgis – producer, engineer, mixing
Brad Filip – design, layout design

References

The Devil Wears Prada (band) albums
2006 debut albums
Rise Records albums
Albums produced by Joey Sturgis